Patumwan Demonstration School, Srinakharinwirot University, commonly known as Satit Patumwan, is a 13-18 public school in Pathum Wan District, Bangkok, Thailand. It was founded in 1953 by Pin Malakul as Secondary educators’ training department, Demonstration Unit, Triam Udom Suksa School, making it the oldest demonstration school in Thailand.

Patumwan Demonstration School's campus is adjacent to Chulalongkorn University and Triam Udom Suksa School on Henri Dunant Road, Pathum Wan District in the heart of the city's commercial district.

Education
The school's Mathayom 1-6 students comprise 50 classes; 38 regular program classes and 12 in the English program. It accepts regular admission to mathayom 1 and 4. In the junior years (mathayom 1–3) the syllabus is uniform for all the students, but in the senior years (mathayom 4–6) the school's syllabus is divided into four programs with different subjects:
 Science–Mathematics
 Mathematics-Arts (English)
 Mathematics-Arts (German/French/Japanese/Chinese)
 Arts–Mathematics (English)*

The difference between science–mathematics and art programs is that art programs do not include science subjects in the syllabus. The program is focused on the study of liberal arts. Each student has a choice of foreign language, but the science–mathematics student has English as the only language option. Programs are chosen by the student entering Mathayom 4 and can't be changed until graduation. The programs are aimed to aid the students during their university periods, even in the stage of entrance preparation.

English Program (EPTS)
Patumwan Demonstration School has an English program, established in 1997, teaching most core subjects in the English language called the EPTS (English Program for Talented Students). The EPTS program is available to all grades and must be chosen prior to admission. It has two classes in each grade, with around 35 students a class.

Notes

References

Schools in Bangkok
Srinakharinwirot University
Pathum Wan district
Educational institutions established in 1953
1953 establishments in Thailand
Demonstration schools in Thailand